Culture Palace is a transfer station on Line 4 and Line 7 of the Chengdu Metro in China. It was opened on 26 December 2015.

Station layout

Gallery

References

Railway stations in Sichuan
Railway stations in China opened in 2015
Chengdu Metro stations